Wayunka (Quechua for "bunch of bananas", Hispanicized spelling Huayunca) is a mountain in the Wansu mountain range in the Andes of Peru that is about  high. It is situated in the Apurímac Region, Antabamba Province, Oropesa District, northwest of the mountains Waytani and Chankuwaña.

References 

Mountains of Peru
Mountains of Apurímac Region